Campania is a region of southern Italy.

Campania may also refer to:

Places

Canada
 Campania Island, British Columbia
 Campania Sound, British Columbia
 Campania, a village in Amaranth, Ontario

Italy
 Ancient Campania, the territory of the ancient city of Capua
 Campania (Catholic ecclesiastical region)

Other countries
 Campania, Tasmania, a township in Australia
 Campania, Georgia, a place in Georgia, U.S.
 Chalastra, formerly Campania, a town in Greece

Ships 
 Campania-class cruiser, in the Italian Regia Marina 1917–1937
 Italian cruiser Campania, lead ship of the class
 HMS Campania, two ships
 RMS Campania, a British ocean liner owned by the Cunard Line
 MV Norstar, a roll-on/roll-off ferry later sold and renamed SNAV Campania

Other 
 Fairey Campania, a British patrol aircraft of the First World War
 377 Campania, a main-belt asteroid

See also 
 Campagna (disambiguation)
 Champagne (disambiguation)
 Latium et Campania, a regio in Roman Italy